The Musée des Civilisations de Côte d'Ivoire is a museum located in Ivory Coast. It is located in Plateau, Abidjan.

References

See also 
 List of museums in Ivory Coast

Museums in Ivory Coast
Buildings and structures in Abidjan